Francesco Pignata (born 14 February 1978) is a former Italian javelin thrower.

Biography
His personal best 81.67, set in 2005, is the second best measure of all-time in Italy, after the national record of Carlo Sonego (84.60 m set in 1999).

From 2 December 2012 Francesco Pignata is Federal Councillor of the Federazione Italiana di Atletica Leggera (FIDAL), in the Alfio Giomi leaderships.

Achievements

National titles
He has won 7 times the individual national championship.
4 wins in Javelin throw (2003, 2004, 2005, 2006)
3 wins in Javelin throw (2006, 2007, 2008) at the Italian Winter Throwing Championships

Progression
1996 - 68.34
1997 - 68.12
2002 - 78.69
2003 - 78.40
2004 - 79.34
2005 - 81.67
2006 - 79.70
2007 - 77.94
2008 - 74.76

See also
 Italian all-time lists - Javelin throw

References

External links
 

1978 births
Living people
Sportspeople from Reggio Calabria
Italian male javelin throwers
Athletics competitors of Fiamme Gialle
World Athletics Championships athletes for Italy
Mediterranean Games silver medalists for Italy
Mediterranean Games medalists in athletics
Athletes (track and field) at the 2005 Mediterranean Games